Magnus Anbo Clausen (born 18 September 2000) is a retired Danish footballer who played as a right back.

Club career

AGF
Anbo joined AGF from local Risskov club Vejlby-Risskov Idrætsklub (VRI) in 2015. 

Anbo was with the first team squad on training camp in the pre-season 2018/19 at the age of 17. Eight days after he turned 18, he got his official debut for AGF against Aarhus Fremad in the Danish Cup on 26 September 2018. In January 2019 he then signed a contract extension and only one month later, AGF decided to offer him a new contract again after the club had sold Dino Mikanović, this time a professional contract until the summer 2021 and he was permanently promoted to the first team squad to replace Mikanović.

On 15 April 2019, Anbo played his first game in the Danish Superliga against SønderjyskE. 

On 9 April 2021, Anbo signed a contract extension until the summer 2022 and was loaned out to Icelandic club Stjarnan until 30 August 2021. The loan deal was later extended with one month, until the end of the Icelandic league.

On 21 October 2021 AGF confirmed, that 21-year old Anbo had decided to retire from football and therefore would leave the club with immediate effect.

Career statistics

References

External links
Magnus Anbo at AGF

2000 births
Living people
Danish men's footballers
Danish expatriate men's footballers
Danish Superliga players
Aarhus Gymnastikforening players
Stjarnan players
Association football defenders
Danish expatriate sportspeople in Iceland
Expatriate footballers in Iceland